This is a non-exhaustive list of Tunisia women's international footballers – association football players who have appeared at least once for the senior Tunisia women's national football team.

Players

See also 
 Tunisia women's national football team

References 

 
Association football player non-biographical articles
Tunisia